China Kallepalle is a village in Ghantasala mandal, in the Krishna District of the Indian state of Andhra Pradesh.

References 

Villages in Krishna district